Canario rojo is a 1955 Argentine film.

Cast
 Elder Barber		
 Alberto Dalbés		
 Héctor Calcaño		
 Luis Dávila		
 Morenita Galé		
 Beatriz Bonnet		
 Don Pelele		
 Fernando Siro		
 Amalia Bernabé		
 Luis García Bosch		
 Marcos Zucker		
 Vassili Lambrinos		
 Amalia Britos		
 Víctor Martucci		
 Pascual Nacarati

External links

References

1955 films
1950s Spanish-language films
Argentine black-and-white films
Films directed by Julio Porter
Argentine comedy films
1955 comedy films
1950s Argentine films